The 1968 Barking Council election took place on 9 May 1968 to elect members of Barking London Borough Council in London, England. The whole council was up for election and the Labour Party stayed in overall control of the council.

Background
This election was the second local election since the borough was formed in 1964. Thus, incumbent councillors were seeking re-election for the first time.
Labour was the only party that ran a full slate of candidates.

Results
Despite the Conservatives winning 13 additional councillors, the Labour Party maintained control electing 32 councillors to the Conservatives 13 and Resident Association 4.

Results by ward

Abbey

Cambell

Chadwell Heath

Eastbrook

Fanshaw

Gascoigne

Heath

Longbridge

Manor

River

Valence

Village

By-elections between 1968 and 1971
There were no by-elections.

References

1968
1968 London Borough council elections